Eboda virescens is a species of moth of the family Tortricidae. It is found in India (Assam), Sri Lanka and Indonesia (Borneo, Java).

References

Moths described in 1964
Tortricini